A gombeen man is a pejorative Hiberno-English term used in Ireland for a shady, small-time "wheeler-dealer" businessman or politician who is always looking to make a quick profit, often at someone else's expense or through the acceptance of bribes. Its origin is the Irish word "gaimbín", meaning monetary interest. The term referred originally to a money-lender and became associated with those shopkeepers and merchants who exploited the starving during the Irish Famine by selling much-needed food and goods on credit at ruinous interest rates.

Cultural significance
The despised image of the gombeen as an usurious predator on the poor was immortalized in the poem "The Gombeen Man" by Irish poet Joseph Campbell:

While the phrase "gombeen man" is almost always intended without any religious or ethnic context, it can be applied in relation to other groups such as, in this instance, a Jewish man:

Crime writer Kyril Bonfiglioli wrote a dark short story called "The Gombeen Man" about just such a character in the late 70s.

This excerpt is from The Crock of Gold, by James Stephens: "... the women were true to their own doctrines and refused to part with information to any persons saving only those of high rank, such as policemen, gombeen men, and district and county councillors; but even to these they charged high prices for their information, and a bonus on any gains which accrued through the following of their ."

More generally, "gombeen" is now an adjective referring to all kinds of underhand or corrupt activities and to the mindset possessed by those engaged in such activities. In Irish politics, it is used to condemn an opponent for dishonesty or corruption, although its definition has become less precise with time and usage and it can also imply pettiness and close-mindedness. Alternative modern parlance for a gombeen man is someone "on the make". It is also used to describe certain Independent politicians who are seen to prioritize their constituents needs, no matter how trivial, over national interests.

Modern use
 "Goodbye Gombeen Man", a Sunday Times headline from 1994, which was referred to in a 2 December 2004 Guardian article. "Mr Reynolds had objected to a 1994 Sunday Times article – headlined 'Goodbye gombeen man. Why a fib too far proved fatal' ..." 
 In the 2016 Irish general election, the term Gombeenism or Gombeen man has been used with the term Parish Pump Politics (a pejorative term that implies local or vanity projects are put before national interests) by populist Left Wing parties against mainstream establishment parties.
 William S. Burroughs, in his book The Adding Machine: Collected Essays, mentions and explains the Gombeen Man in a story entitled "Bugger The Queen." He posits the monarchy as a sort of country-wide Gombeen racket, and refers to the Queen as a Gombeen Woman.

See also
Fartsovka
Kulak
Political corruption
Spiv
Cute hoor at Wiktionary
Gombeen at Wiktionary

References

General references

Inline citations

Irish slang